John Brisbin (July 13, 1818 – February 3, 1880) was a Democratic member of the U.S. House of Representatives from Pennsylvania.

Early life 
John Brisbin was born in Sherburne, New York. He taught school before studying law and establishing a legal practice in Tunkhannock, Pennsylvania, about 1843.

Career 
Brisbin was elected as a Democrat to the thirty-first Congress to fill the vacancy caused by the death of United States Representative Chester P. Butler.  He served as president of the Delaware, Lackawanna and Western Railroad Company from 1863 to 1867 and member of the board of managers and general counsel from 1867 to 1880.

Death 
Brisbin died in Newark, New Jersey at the age of 61. He was interred in Evergreen Cemetery in Hillside, New Jersey.

Sources

The Political Graveyard

1818 births
1880 deaths
People from Sherburne, New York
Pennsylvania lawyers
Politicians from Newark, New Jersey
People from the Scranton–Wilkes-Barre metropolitan area
Democratic Party members of the United States House of Representatives from Pennsylvania
Burials at Evergreen Cemetery (Hillside, New Jersey)
19th-century American politicians
Lawyers from Newark, New Jersey
19th-century American lawyers